Arhopalus cubensis is a species of beetle in the family Cerambycidae. It was described by Mutchler in 1914.

References

Spondylidinae
Beetles described in 1914